Jaromír Vaňous (born 24 September 1955) is a Czech racewalker. He competed in the men's 50 kilometres walk at the 1980 Summer Olympics.

References

External links
 

1955 births
Living people
Athletes (track and field) at the 1980 Summer Olympics
Czech male racewalkers
Olympic athletes of Czechoslovakia
People from Ústí nad Orlicí
Sportspeople from the Pardubice Region